Bandiagara Airport  is an airport serving  Bandiagara in Mali.

References

 Bandiagara
 Google Earth

Airports in Mali